The Return of the Vikings is a 1944 British short feature from Ealing Studios, directed and co-written by Charles Frend. It is a dramatised documentary concerning a Norwegian fishing boat in time of war.

Cast
Leo Genn as Narrator (voice)
Frederick Piper as Sgt. Fred Johnson
Stig Egede-Nissen as Gunnar		
Valerie Holman

References

External links
Return of the Vikings at IMDb
Return of the Vikings at BFI

1944 films
Films directed by Charles Frend
British black-and-white films
British documentary films
1944 documentary films
1940s British films